Erhiga Agarivbie (born 30 March 1987), better known by his stage name Erigga, is a Nigerian singer and rapper.

Biography 

Erhiga Agarivbie was born in Warri, Delta State, where he grew up with his family. He is the first of five children. He attended Standard International School both primary and secondary.

Erigga began his music career in early 2010. He has worked with several producers, including Mr Nolimit,C Major,Beatsbymellow_ , and Even Prinx Emmanuel. Erigga's first musical release was "Mo Street Gan". The music video for the song was shot in Nigeria, directed by AKIN Alabi. The song became Radio Continental's theme song.

In 2013, Erigga released "Coupé Décalé ft Shuun Bebe". The music video for the song was endorsed by TV stations in Nigeria. In early 2014, he released another single titled "Love No Be Garri", featuring Jimoh Waxiu.
In 17 July 2017 Erigga released his album A Trip To The South which includes Orezi, Skales, Duncan Mighty and many others.
In 2018, Erigga released another hit single titled "Motivation" featuring Victor AD. This song has gained over a million views on YouTube.

Erigga released his highly anticipated project "The Erigma 2" Album.
The body of work, "The Erigma 2" has 18 tracks with guest appearances from Victor AD, Zlatan, Magnito, MI Abaga, Ice Prince, Vector and others.
The Erigma 2 album has production credits to Mr. Nolimit, C Major, KO Beat, Kulboy Beats, Doka Shot, Lex Amazing, Prinx Emmanuel and co productions from Beatsbymellow_. The Album was mixed and mastered by Mr. Nolimit.

Awards and nominations

Discography

Studio albums

References 

1987 births
Living people
Musicians from Warri
21st-century Nigerian musicians
Nigerian male rappers
People from Delta State
21st-century male musicians